Richard M. Furlaud (1923-2018) was an American businessman who headed Squibb Beech-Nut until 1991.

Biography
Furlaud was born on 15 April 1923 in New York City. He spent his early life in Europe when his family moved to Paris and remained there until 1941. 

Upon his return to the United States, he joined Princeton University from where he graduated in 1943. After his graduation from Princeton, he joined Harvard Law School and completed his law degree in 1947.

In 1988, Rockefeller University conferred him an honorary degree for his work in pharma sector.

References

2018 deaths
American businesspeople
Bristol Myers Squibb people
Princeton University alumni
Harvard Law School alumni